Syed Hasan (1 January 1908  18 November 1988) was an Indian writer, scholar and professor of Persian language and literature from Patna, Bihar. He was a great scholar "steeped into Persian". He headed the Persian Department of Patna University from 1972 to 1978.
In  1954–55, he was awarded  a scholarship under the Government of India Foreign Languages Scholarships Scheme for Studying in Iran.

Publications

References

20th-century Indian Muslims
Writers from Patna
Writers of Mithila
Poets from Bihar
Urdu-language poets from India
1908 births
1988 deaths
Academic staff of Patna University
20th-century Indian poets
Indian male poets
20th-century Indian male writers
Recipients of Ghalib Award